Dobra , also known as Dobra Nowogardzka, is a town in Łobez County, West Pomeranian Voivodeship, Poland, with 2,215 inhabitants as of December 2021.

History

In the Middle Ages a Slavic gród existed in present-day Dobra. In the 10th century the area became part of the emerging Polish state under Mieszko I of Poland. It was granted town rights before 1331. In the 13th and 14th centuries a castle was built, rebuilt later in the 16th century, and heavily damaged in the 17th to 19th centuries. In 1647, due to the plague epidemic, the population of Dobra fell from over 600 to 48 people. In 1895, a narrow-gauge railway was built, connecting the town with Stargard.

Gallery

References

External links
Official town webpage

Cities and towns in West Pomeranian Voivodeship
Łobez County